Saint-Stanislas is a municipality in Maria-Chapdelaine Regional County Municipality in the Saguenay–Lac-Saint-Jean region of Quebec, Canada. Its population was 353 in the Canada 2011 Census.

Demographics
Population trend:
 Population in 2011: 353 (2006 to 2011 population change: 2.3%)
 Population in 2006: 345
 Population in 2001: 340
 Population in 1996: 319
 Population in 1991: 322

Private dwellings occupied by usual residents: 141 (total dwellings: 198)

Mother tongue:
 English as first language: 0%
 French as first language: 100%
 English and French as first language: 0%
 Other as first language: 0%

References

Municipalities in Quebec
Incorporated places in Saguenay–Lac-Saint-Jean
Maria-Chapdelaine Regional County Municipality